Bartenev/Bartenyov (Бартенев/Бартенёв) or Barteneva/Bartenyova (Бартенева/Бартенёва; feminine) is a Russian surname. Notable people with the surname include:

Bartenev 
 Aleksandr Nikolaevich Bartenev (Александр Николаевич Бартенев; 1882—1946) was a Russian zoologist.
 Andrey Bartenev (Андрей Бартенев, b. 1969), is a Russian artist, sculptor, experimentalist, and creator of many provocative, interactive installations and performances.
 Leonid Bartenyev (Леонид Владимирович Бартенев, b. 1933), was a Soviet athlete who competed mainly in the 100 metres.
 Pyotr Ivanovich Bartenev (Пётр Иванович Бартенев; 1829—1912), was a Russian historian and collector of unpublished memoirs.

References

Russian-language surnames